Contai Town Rakhal Chandra Vidyapith,  is a higher secondary school located in the sub-divisional town of Contai, Purba Medinipur, West Bengal, India..

The school follows the course curricula of West Bengal Board of Secondary Education (WBBSE) and West Bengal Council of Higher Secondary Education (WBCHSE) for Standard 10th and 12th Board examinations respectively.

References

High schools and secondary schools in West Bengal
Schools in Purba Medinipur district
Educational institutions in India with year of establishment missing